Under Pressure is a 1935 American drama film directed by Raoul Walsh, written by Borden Chase, Lester Cole and Noel Pierce, and starring Edmund Lowe, Victor McLaglen, Florence Rice, Marjorie Rambeau, Charles Bickford and Sig Ruman. It was released on February 1, 1935, by Fox Film Corporation.
 
Borden Chase acted as technical adviser. The film was also known as East River and Man Lock.

Plot

Cast 
Edmund Lowe as Shocker Dugan
Victor McLaglen as Jumbo Smith
Florence Rice as Pat Dodge
Marjorie Rambeau as Amelia 'Amy' Hardcastle
Charles Bickford as Nipper Moran
Sig Ruman as Doctor
Roger Imhof as George Breck
Warner Richmond as Weasel
James Donlan as Corky

References

External links 
 
 

1935 films
Fox Film films
American drama films
1935 drama films
Films directed by Raoul Walsh
American black-and-white films
1930s English-language films
1930s American films